Soviet submarine S-363 was a Soviet Navy  of the Baltic Fleet, which became notable under the designation U137 when it ran aground on 27 October 1981 on the south coast of Sweden, approximately  from Karlskrona, one of the largest Swedish naval bases. U137 was the unofficial Swedish name for the vessel, as the Soviets considered names of most of their submarines to be classified at the time and did not disclose them. The ensuing international incident is often referred to as the Whiskey on the rocks incident.

Standoff

The boat's presence coincided with a Swedish naval exercise, testing new equipment, in the area. Swedish naval forces reacted to the breach of sovereignty by sending an unarmed naval officer aboard the boat to meet the captain and demand an explanation. The captain initially claimed that simultaneous failures of navigational equipment had caused the boat to get lost (despite the fact that the boat had already somehow navigated through a treacherous series of rocks, straits, and islands to get so close to the naval base). The Soviet Navy would later issue a conflicting statement claiming that the boat had been forced into Swedish waters due to severe distress, although the boat had never sent a distress signal, and instead attempted to escape.

The Swedes were determined to continue investigating the circumstances of the situation. The Soviet captain, after a guarantee of his immunity, was taken off the boat and interrogated in the presence of Soviet representatives. Additionally, Swedish naval officers examined the logbooks and instruments of the submarine. The Swedish National Defence Research Institute also secretly measured for radioactive materials from outside the hull, using gamma ray spectroscopy from a specially configured Coast Guard boat. They detected something that was almost certainly uranium-238 inside the submarine, localized to the port torpedo tube.  was routinely used as cladding in nuclear weapons and the Swedes suspected that the submarine was in fact nuclear armed. The yield of the probable weapon was estimated to be the same as the bomb dropped over Nagasaki in 1945. Although the presence of nuclear weapons on board S-363 was never officially confirmed by the Soviet authorities, the vessel's political officer, Vasily Besedin, later confirmed that there were nuclear warheads on some of the torpedoes, and that the crew was ordered to destroy the boat, including these warheads, if Swedish forces tried to take control of the vessel.

As the Soviet captain was being interrogated, the weather worsened and the Soviet submarine sent out a distress call. In Swedish radar control centers, the storm interfered with their radar image. Soviet jamming could also have been a factor. As the Soviet submarine sent its distress call, two ships coming from the direction of the nearby Soviet armada were detected passing the  limit headed for Karlskrona.

This produced the most dangerous period of the crisis and was when the Swedish prime minister Thorbjörn Fälldin gave his order to "Hold the border" to the Supreme Commander of the Swedish Armed Forces, General Lennart Ljung. The coastal batteries, now fully manned as well as the mobile coastal artillery guns and mine stations, went to "action stations". The Swedish Air Force scrambled strike aircraft armed with modern anti-ship missiles and reconnaissance aircraft, knowing that the weather would not allow rescue helicopters to fly in the event of an engagement. After a tense 20 minutes, General Ljung called Prime Minister Fälldin again and informed him that it was not Soviet surface ships but two German merchant ships.

The submarine was stuck on the rock for nearly 10 days. On 5 November it was hauled off the rocks by Swedish tugs and escorted to international waters where it was handed over to the Soviet fleet.

Interpretations
At the time, the incident was generally seen as a proof of widespread Soviet infiltration of the Swedish coastline, and U.S. commentators encouraged Sweden to deploy incident weapons to deter future infiltration. On the basis of an investigation carried out after the incident, the Swedish government concluded that the submarine had entered Swedish waters knowingly, in order to conduct illegal activities.

In an interview in 2006, Vasily Besedin, the political officer on board, gave a different picture. The vessel had dual navigation systems, a well-trained crew and the captain Pyotr Gushchin was amongst the best. On board was staff officer Joseph Avrukevich who was trained in security techniques. Besedin claimed the incident was caused by an error in calculations by the navigation officer. Besedin was however a political officer with no training in submarine operations.

The area in which the Soviet submarine ran aground was at the time a restricted military zone where no foreign nationals were allowed. The exact location served as one of only two routes that could be used to move bigger ships from the naval base in Karlskrona to open water.

This incident is popularly known in the West as "Whiskey on the rocks" (the rock-grounded submarine being a ). In the Soviet Navy the submarine came to be known as "Swedish Komsomolets", a pun on both the incident and the then widespread tendency to give the submarines Komsomol-themed names.

See also
 Swedish submarine incidents

References

Bibliography

Further reading
 

Whiskey-class submarines
Ships built in the Soviet Union
1956 ships
Cold War
Cold War submarines of the Soviet Union

Maritime incidents in 1981
Soviet submarine accidents
International maritime incidents

1981 in Sweden
1981 in the Soviet Union
1981 in military history
Maritime incidents in Sweden
November 1981 events in Europe
Political history of Sweden
Ships built at the Baltic Shipyard
Soviet Union–Sweden relations